Johann Sebastian Bach composed the church cantata  (Lord, Your eyes look for faith), 102 in Leipzig for the tenth Sunday after Trinity and it was first performed  on 25 August 1726.

History and text 
The cantata of Bach's third annual cycle in Leipzig was written for the Tenth Sunday after Trinity. The prescribed readings for the Sunday were from the First Epistle to the Corinthians, different gifts, but one spirit, and from the Gospel of Luke, Jesus announcing the destruction of Jerusalem and cleansing of the Temple. The words of the cantata are only generally connected to the readings, asking the soul to return immediately to God's ways. The cantata is closed by verses 6 and 7 of the hymn "" by Johann Heermann (1630), sung on the melody of Martin Luther's "" based on the Lord's Prayer. The words of the free poetry have been attributed to different authors: C. S. Terry suggests Christian Weiss Sr, Werner Neumann suggests Christiana Mariana von Ziegler, and Walther Blankenburg suggests Christoph Helm.

Bach first performed the cantata on 25 August 1726 and again around 1737.

Scoring and structure 
The cantata is scored for alto, tenor and bass soloists and a four-part choir (SATB), flauto traverso, two oboes, two violins, viola, and basso continuo. The seven movements are structured in two parts, part two to be performed after the sermon.

 Chorus: 
 Recitative (bass): 
 Aria (alto): 
 Arioso (bass): 
Parte seconda
 Aria (tenor): 
 Recitative (alto): 
 Chorale:

Music 
The opening chorus is a mature work containing an intricate combination of instrumental and vocal parts and a variety of expressive devices depicting the words. The opening sinfonia is in two parts which are repeated separately and together throughout the movement. The words  are repeated three times.

Movements 3 and 5 are used in the Missa in F major. The bass part has been recorded by singers who do not specialise in Baroque music, such as Dietrich Fischer-Dieskau with conductor Benjamin Britten at the Aldeburgh Festival. The final chorale uses the tune of Vater unser im Himmelreich.

Recordings 
 Britten at Aldeburgh (BBC) – Bach: Cantatas 102 & 151, Benjamin Britten, Aldeburgh Festival Singers, English Chamber Orchestra, Janet Baker, Peter Pears, Dietrich Fischer-Dieskau, Decca 1965
 Die Bach Kantate Vol. 47, Helmuth Rilling, Gächinger Kantorei, Bach-Collegium Stuttgart, Eva Randová, Kurt Equiluz, Wolfgang Schöne, Hänssler 1972
 Les Grandes Cantates de J. S. Bach Vol. 27, Fritz Werner, Heinrich-Schütz-Chor Heilbronn, Württembergisches Kammerorchester Heilbronn, Barbara Scherler, Theo Altmeyer, Bruce Abel, Erato 1973
 Bach Cantatas Vol. 4 – Sundays after Trinity I, Karl Richter, Münchener Bach-Chor, Münchener Bach-Orchester, Julia Hamari, Peter Schreier, Dietrich Fischer-Dieskau, Archiv Produktion 1977
 J. S. Bach: Das Kantatenwerk – Sacred Cantatas Vol. 6, Nikolaus Harnoncourt, Tölzer Knabenchor, Concentus Musicus Wien, Paul Esswood, Kurt Equiluz, Philippe Huttenlocher, Teldec 1980
 Bach Cantatas Vol. 5: Rendsburg/Braunschweig, John Eliot Gardiner, Monteverdi Choir, English Baroque Soloists, Daniel Taylor, Christoph Genz, Gotthold Schwarz, Soli Deo Gloria 2000
 J. S. Bach: Complete Cantatas Vol. 11, Ton Koopman, Amsterdam Baroque Orchestra & Choir, Bogna Bartosz, James Gilchrist, Klaus Mertens, Antoine Marchand 2002
 J. S. Bach: Cantatas for the Complete Liturgical Year Vol. 3, Sigiswald Kuijken, La Petite Bande, Petra Noskaiová, Christoph Genz, Jan van der Crabben, Accent 2003
 J. S. Bach: Cantatas Vol. 46, Masaaki Suzuki, Bach Collegium Japan, Robin Blaze, Gerd Türk, Peter Kooy, BIS 2009
 J. S. Bach Lutheran Masses, Vol. 1. Harry Christophers, The Sixteen, Coro 2013.  This recording of the cantata is presented with the Masses in G minor, BWV 235, and F major, BWV 233.

References

Sources 
 
 Herr, deine Augen sehen nach dem Glauben BWV 102; BC A 119 / Sacred cantata (10th Sunday after Trinity) Bach Digital
 Cantata BWV 102 Herr, deine Augen sehen nach dem Glauben! history, scoring, sources for text and music, translations to various languages, discography, discussion, Bach Cantatas Website
 BWV 102 Herr, deine Augen sehen nach dem Glauben English translation, University of Vermont
 BWV 102 Herr, deine Augen sehen nach dem Glauben text, scoring, University of Alberta
 Chapter 22 BWV 102 Herr, deine Augen sehen nach dem Glauben / Lord, Your eyes seek out true faith. Julian Mincham, 2010
 
 Luke Dahn: BWV 102.7 bach-chorales.com

External links 
 Herr, deine Augen sehen nach dem Glauben, BWV 102: performance by the Netherlands Bach Society (video and background information)

Church cantatas by Johann Sebastian Bach
1726 compositions